Jacques Bizet (10 July 1872 – 3 November 1922) was a French physician and businessman best known for his childhood friendship with the novelist Marcel Proust, whom he predeceased by fifteen days when he committed suicide. The composer Georges Bizet (who died in 1875 when Jacques was not quite three) was his father.   His mother was the literary hostess, born Geneviève Halévy.   The essayist-historian Daniel Halévy (1872–1962) was his cousin.

Biography
Jacques Bizet was born in Paris; with his forename coming from his father Georges' patron and his cousin Jacques-Fromental Halévy, who was his grandfather.

His father's sudden and early death seems to have encouraged his particularly close attachment to his mother, who in 1886 remarried. Her second husband was a wealthy lawyer and passionate art collector called Émile Straus (1844–1929).    The close relationship between mother and son does not seem to have been unduly affected by the mother's remarriage.   According to one source, when someone asked the vivacious widowed socialite why on earth she had married the ill-tempered balding attorney, she replied that it had been "the only way to get rid of him".   Geneviève Straus ran a lively literary salon, which helped to stave off the depression towards which she tended, and which her son seems to have inherited.   Running the salon meant that the boy came to know many of the Parisian artistic and literary celebrities of the day.  Georges Bizet was virtually unknown at the time of his death, but the posthumous success of his work, and in particular the  huge success of his opera Carmen, meant that by the time he enrolled at an exclusive primary school that followed the curriculum created by Marie Pape-Carpantier, Jacques Bizet had become the son of a famous composer.   His cousin and contemporary Daniel Halévy started at the same school at the same time:  he was a large child and soon established himself as the school bully.   Another pupil, a year senior to the cousins, but physically relatively puny, was Marcel Proust.   In some ways all three boys had similar backgrounds:  at a time when racial identity was rising up the socio-political agenda, they would all have been regarded as half-Jewish, but the parents of all three had nevertheless had them baptised into Christian churches.

When the time came for secondary school the cousins moved on to the prestigious Lycée Condorcet.   Contemporaries who would later achieve a measure of notability included Robert Dreyfus and Fernand Gregh.   One year ahead, as before, was Marcel Proust.   The relationship between the cousins and the future iconic novelist were affected by Proust's curiously guileless homosexuality.   He wrote a succession of letters to the cousins expressing his feelings with an openness that shocked and unsettled them.   There was no sense that his feelings of attraction were ever reciprocated.   The result in the immediate term seems to have been that, more than ever, Proust became a target of mocking, mistreatment and bullying by Bizet, Halévy and the gang that formed around them.   In his diary entry on a poem by Proust which he perceived as homoerotic, the young Daniel Halévy confided that he thought Proust "more gifted than anyone", but the talented poet was also "young and weak, [and] not enough of a boy for us".   At one point Geneviève Straus became so exasperated by Proust's homoerotic fixation on her son and his cousin, that she refused to allow the gifted young writer admission to the literary salon that doubled as her family home.

There were nevertheless forces in the relationship between the cousins and Proust that sustained it in more positive ways.   In addition to their physical attractions, Proust seems to have been somewhat in awe of the cousins' family connections.  Daniel's father, Ludovic Halévy, was a versatile author and dramatist whose fame among Parisian intellectuals at the time would have been quite as great as that of the composer Georges Bizet.   It is also more than possible that as a teenager Proust was already becoming aware of the extent to which he would be able to copy, adapt and incorporate physical, psychological and behavioural traits in his school contemporaries and their family members in future novels.  For their part, Halévy and Bizet were genuinely in awe of Proust's precocious and formidable talent.   Their family backgrounds predisposed them to a love for literature: they were not without their own ambitions in that respect.   By the time the boys left school the bullying had ended.   All the boys were destined to inhabit the same haute-bourgeois milieu of Parisian intellectuals:  friendship between Marcel Proust and Jacques Bizet would endure.   Before that, while still at school Halévy and Bizet teamed up to found two small scale literary reviews, "Revue Verte" and "Revue Lilas".  Proust and Gregh joined in with the projects.   Three years later Fernand Gregh founded another review magazine, Le Banquet, which was published monthly between March 1892 and March 1893.   Leading members of the twentieth century literary establishment were among the contributors, including Gaston Arman de Caillavet, Robert de Flers Daniel Halévy and Marcel Proust.   Another contributor, Léon Blum, later became Prime Minister of France.   Jacques Bizet authored a number of the articles.   The sudden closure of Le Banquet after only a year came as a surprise.   Jacques Bizet now wrote several subsequently forgotten theatre pieces, influenced by the plays of Pierre de Marivaux and Oscar Wilde.   By the end of 1893, however, while still rebutting the unwanted advances of his friend Marcel Proust, Jacques Bizet had to some extent distanced himself from the literary scene and enrolled at the University of Paris as a medical student.

The study of medicine did not cause Bizet entirely to break away from the world of the arts.   During his second and, as matters turned out,  final student year he joined with Jacques-Émile Blanche to set up a Théâtre d'ombres review.   By this time Marcel Proust's exclusion from the home of Geneviève Straus had long since been rescinded, and he was again one of the "men of letters" who frequented the salon where, according to several commentators, he found a rich pool of characters who would find their way into his novels, their habits and features not necessarily much modified.   In the increasingly politicised atmosphere of the times the salon was naturally ardently pro-Dreyfus, perhaps taking a lead from the half-Jewish hostess and her Jewish husband, who was frequently rumoured to be an illegitimate half-brother to the Rothschild brothers.   Like Proust, Jacques Bizet signed the famous pro-Dreyfus petition which appeared in Le Temps on 15 January 1898 in response to Émile Zola's incendiary open letter under the headline "J'Accuse…!" which had appeared in L'Aurore two days earlier.   The political and social polarisation provoked by the Dreyfus affair was nevertheless followed by a decline in popularity for the salon of  Mme. Straus, as people avoided being seen in the company of those who had taken an opposite position in the affair.   A few years later, in 1902, Bizet was provoked into challenging the dramaturge André Picard to a duel.   A tragic denouement was narrowly avoided.

Meanwhile the motor industry was booming.  In 1903 France remained the world's leading automaker, producing 30,124 cars (nearly 49% of the world total) as against 11,235 cars produced in the USA.   Jacques Bizet joined the bandwagon, becoming a director of "Taximètres Unic de Monaco", a substantial taxi business that had been founded by the Rothschilds.   Marcel Proust became one of the company's most devoted customers, taking long  taxi trips into the Normandy countryside which provided the backdrop for some of his best known novels.   It was indeed as a result of this arrangement that Proust came to know Alfred Agostinelli, who in 1913 exchanged the life of a (by this point unemployed) taxi driver for a job as Proust's secretary-stenographer, although some sources indicate that in making the appointment Proust was driven primarily by romantic considerations.   Agostinelli is important to Proust scholars because he is generally seen as the basis for the character of "Albertine" who features prominently in several volumes of "À la recherche du temps perdu".

Bizet also worked with the Paris automobile manufacturer Georges Richard.   Richard was extensively funded by the Rothschilds, with whom Jacques Bizet was believed to have family connections.   According to one source Bizet ran a dealership selling cars for Richard.   In 1905 the two men teamed up (with others) to launch Unic cars.   It was through Georges Richard that Jacques Bizet met Jules Salomon.   In 1909 Salomon left to set up business independently of Richard: Bizet joined up with him to establish the automobile manufacturer known to posterity as Le Zèbre.   Salomon was the engineer-entrepreneur while Bizet was the principal source of funds for the enterprise.

Over the next few years Bizet became increasingly irascible.   In 1912, three days after a disagreement in a theatre foyer which ended with Bizet slapping Count Hubert de Pierredon across the face, he and de Pierredon, albeit without either causing the other lasting damage.   Two years the outbreak of war found him serving as a military physician at the Saint-Martin Hospital.   Later during the war he managed a munitions factory.

Personal life
On 1 June 1898 Jacques Bizet married a distant cousin, Madeleine Breguet, in Paris.   She died on 15 October 1900 while undergoing an operation under the surgeon-gynecologist Samuel Jean de Pozzi, a former lover of Bizet's mother.   Jacques Bizet's second marriage, to Alice Franckel, took place in 1904.  It was a second marriage for both of them.   Alice Franckel had been born in Hamburg:  it is not known when or how she moved to Paris. In 1919 Jacques Bizet's second marriage ended in divorce.

According to at least one source Jacques Bizet was crushed by the family environment into which he had been born.   During his final years he became an alcoholic and a morphine addict.   In the end he committed suicide, shooting himself in the head, over matters involving his mistress, a couple of weeks before the death of his life-long friend Marcel Proust.

References

Businesspeople from Paris
Marcel Proust
Lycée Condorcet alumni
French military doctors
Suicides by firearm in France
Burials at Père Lachaise Cemetery
1872 births
1922 suicides
Georges Bizet
19th-century French physicians
20th-century French physicians
20th-century French businesspeople
1922 deaths